Amos Oz (born Amos Klausner; 4 May 1939 – 28 December 2018) was an Israeli writer, novelist, journalist, and intellectual. He was also a professor of Hebrew literature at Ben-Gurion University of the Negev. From 1967 onwards, Oz was a prominent advocate of a two-state solution to the Israeli–Palestinian conflict.

He was the author of 40 books, including novels, short story collections, children's books, and essays, and his work has been published in 45 languages, more than that of any other Israeli writer. He was the recipient of many honours and awards, among them the Friedenspreis des Deutschen Buchhandels, the Legion of Honour of France, the Israel Prize, the Goethe Prize, the Prince of Asturias Award in Literature, the Heinrich Heine Prize, and the Franz Kafka Prize.

Oz is regarded as one of "Israel's most prolific writers and respected intellectuals", as The New York Times worded it in an obituary.

Biography 
Amos Klausner (later Oz) was born in 1939 in Jerusalem, Mandatory Palestine, where he grew up at No. 18 Amos Street in the Kerem Avraham neighborhood. He was the only child of Fania (Mussman) and Yehuda Arieh Klausner, immigrants to Mandatory Palestine who had met while studying at the Hebrew University of Jerusalem. His father's family was from Lithuania, where they had been farmers, raising cattle and vegetables near Vilnius. His father studied history and literature in Vilnius (then part of Poland), and hoped to become a professor of comparative literature, but never gained headway in the academic world. He worked most of his life as a librarian at the Jewish National and University Library. Oz's mother grew up in Rivne (then part of Poland, now Ukraine). She was a highly sensitive and cultured daughter of a wealthy mill owner and his wife, and attended Charles University in Prague, where she studied history and philosophy. She had to abandon her studies when her father's business collapsed during the Great Depression.

Oz's parents were multilingual (his father claimed he could read in 16 or 17 languages, while his mother spoke four or five languages, but could read in seven or eight) but neither was comfortable speaking in Hebrew, which was adopted as the official language of Israel. They spoke with each other in Russian or Polish, but the only language they allowed Oz to learn was Hebrew.

Many of Oz's family members were right-wing Revisionist Zionists. His great-uncle Joseph Klausner was the Herut party candidate for the presidency against Chaim Weizmann and was chair of the Hebrew literature department at the Hebrew University of Jerusalem. Klausner had a large personal library in his home and hosted salons for Israeli intellectuals; the lifestyle and scholarship of Klausner left an impression on Oz as a young boy.

Oz described himself as an "atheist of the book", stating from a secular perspective that his Jewish heritage "contains first and foremost books [and] texts". His parents were not religious growing up, though Oz attended the community religious school, Tachkemoni, since the only alternative was a socialist school affiliated with the Labor movement, to which his family was even more opposed. The noted poet Zelda Schneersohn Mishkovsky was one of his teachers. After Tachkemoni, he attended Gymnasia Rehavia.

During the Holocaust, some of his family members were killed in Lithuania.

His mother, who suffered from depression, committed suicide in January 1952, when he was 12. Oz would later explore the repercussions of this event in his memoir A Tale of Love and Darkness.

At age 14, Oz became a Labor Zionist, left home, and joined Kibbutz Hulda. There he was adopted by the Huldai family and changed his surname to "Oz" (Hebrew: "courage"). Later asked why he did not leave Jerusalem for Tel Aviv, he replied, "Tel Aviv was not radical enough – only the kibbutz was radical enough". By his own account he was "a disaster as a laborer...the joke of the kibbutz". When Oz first began to write, the kibbutz allotted him one day per week for this work. When his novel My Michael became a best-seller, Oz quipped, "I became a branch of the farm, yet they still said I could have just three days a week to write. It was only in the eighties when I got four days for my writing, two days for teaching, and Saturday turns as a waiter in the dining hall".

Oz did his Israel Defense Forces service in the Nahal Brigade, participating in border skirmishes with Syria. After concluding his three years of mandatory regular army service, he was sent by his kibbutz to the Hebrew University of Jerusalem, where he studied philosophy and Hebrew literature. He graduated in 1963 and began teaching in the kibbutz high school, while continuing to write. He served as an army reservist in a tank unit which fought in the Sinai Peninsula during the Six-Day War, and in the Golan Heights during the Yom Kippur War.

Oz married Nily Zuckerman in 1960, and they had three children. The family continued to live at Hulda until 1986, when they moved to Arad in the Negev to seek relief for their son  asthma. Oz was a full professor of Hebrew literature at Ben-Gurion University of the Negev from 1987 to 2014. He also served as a writer in residence and visiting scholar at universities abroad. In 2014, the family moved to Tel Aviv. His oldest daughter, Fania Oz-Salzberger, teaches history at the University of Haifa.

Oz died of cancer on 28 December 2018 in Rabin Medical Center, Petah Tikva, aged 79. He was buried at Kibbutz Hulda.

In February 2021, Oz's daughter  accused her late father of subjecting her to "sadistic abuse." In her autobiography "Something Disguised as Love", Galia alleged that Amos Oz beat, swore at, and humiliated her in a routine of emotional, verbal, and physical abuse, writing that "The violence was creative: He dragged me from inside the house and threw me outside. He called me trash. Not a passing loss of control and not a slap in the face here or there, but a routine of sadistic abuse." Members of Galia's family have denied the allegations, claiming that "We have known all our lives a very different Amos, a warm and affectionate man who loved his family deeply and gently." In 2022, Oz's son Daniel published a memoir staunchly defending his father and criticizing his sister for distorting the truth.

Literary career

Oz published his first book, Where the Jackals Howl, a collection of short stories, in 1965. His first novel, Another Place (published in U.S. as Elsewhere, Perhaps) appeared in 1966. Subsequently, Oz averaged a book per year with the Histadrut press Am Oved. Oz became a primary figure in the Israeli "New Wave" movement in literature in the 1960s, a group which included A. B. Yehoshua, Amalia Kahana-Carmon, and Aharon Appelfeld.

Oz published 40 books, among them 14 novels, five collections of stories and novellas, two children's books, and twelve books of articles and essays (as well as eight selections of essays that appeared in various languages), and about 450 articles and essays. His works have been translated into some 45 languages, more than any other Israeli writer. In 2007, a selection from the Chinese translation of A Tale of Love and Darkness was the first work of modern Hebrew literature to appear in an official Chinese textbook. The story "Esperanto" from the collection Between Friends was translated into Esperanto in 2015.

Oz's political commentary and literary criticism have been published in the Histadrut newspaper Davar and Yedioth Ahronoth. Translations of his essays have appeared in the New York Review of Books. The Ben-Gurion University of the Negev maintains an archive of his work.

Oz tended to present protagonists in a realistic light with an ironic touch while his treatment of the life in the kibbutz was accompanied by a somewhat critical tone. Oz credited a 1959 translation of American writer Sherwood Anderson's short story collection Winesburg, Ohio with his decision to "write about what was around me." In A Tale of Love and Darkness, his memoir of coming of age in the midst of Israel's violent birth pangs, Oz credited Anderson's "modest book" with his own realization that "the written world ... always revolves around the hand that is writing, wherever it happens to be writing: where you are is the center of the universe." In his 2004 essay "How to Cure a Fanatic" (later the title essay of a 2006 collection), Oz argues that the Israeli-Palestinian conflict is not a war of religion or cultures or traditions, but rather a real estate dispute – one that will be resolved not by greater understanding, but by painful compromise.

Views and opinions 

Oz was one of the first Israelis to advocate a two-state solution to the Israeli–Palestinian conflict after the Six-Day War. He did so in a 1967 article "Land of our Forefathers" in the Labor newspaper Davar. "Even unavoidable occupation is a corrupting occupation," he wrote. In 1978, he was one of the founders of Peace Now. He did not oppose (and in 1991 advocated) the construction of an Israeli West Bank barrier, but believed that it should be roughly along the Green Line, the 1949 Armistice line between Israel and Jordan. He also advocated that Jerusalem be divided into numerous zones, not just Jewish and Palestinian zones, including one for the Eastern Orthodox, one for Hasidic Jews, an international zone, and so on.

He was opposed to Israeli settlement activity and was among the first to praise the Oslo Accords and talks with the PLO. In his speeches and essays he frequently attacked the non-Zionist left and always emphasized his Zionist identity. He was perceived as an eloquent spokesperson of the Zionist left. When Shimon Peres retired from leadership of the Israeli Labor Party, he is said to have named Oz as one of three possible successors, along with Ehud Barak (later Prime Minister) and Shlomo Ben-Ami (later Barak's foreign minister). In the 1990s, Oz withdrew his support from Labor and went further left to the Meretz Party, where he had close connections with the leader, Shulamit Aloni. In the elections to the sixteenth Knesset that took place in 2003, Oz appeared in the Meretz television campaign, calling upon the public to vote for Meretz.

Oz was a supporter of the Second Lebanon War in 2006. In the Los Angeles Times, he wrote: "Many times in the past, the Israeli peace movement has criticized Israeli military operations. Not this time. This time, the battle is not over Israeli expansion and colonization. There is no Lebanese territory occupied by Israel. There are no territorial claims from either side... The Israeli peace movement should support Israel's attempt at self-defense, pure and simple, as long as this operation targets mostly Hezbollah and spares, as much as possible, the lives of Lebanese civilians." Later, Oz changed his position of unequivocal support of the war as "self-defense" in the wake of the cabinet's decision to expand operations in Lebanon.

A day before the outbreak of the 2008–2009 Israel–Gaza conflict, Oz signed a statement supporting military action against Hamas in the Gaza Strip. Two weeks later, he advocated a ceasefire with Hamas and called attention to the harsh conditions there. He was quoted in the Italian paper Corriere della Sera as saying Hamas was responsible for the outbreak of violence, but the time had come to seek a ceasefire. Oz also said that if innocent citizens were indeed killed in Gaza, it should be treated as a war crime, although he doubted that bombing UN structures was intentional.

In a June 2010 editorial in The New York Times, he wrote: "Hamas is not just a terrorist organization. Hamas is an idea, a desperate and fanatical idea that grew out of the desolation and frustration of many Palestinians. No idea has ever been defeated by force... To defeat an idea, you have to offer a better idea, a more attractive and acceptable one... Israel has to sign a peace agreement with President Mahmoud Abbas and his Fatah government in the West Bank."

In March 2011, Oz sent imprisoned former Tanzim leader Marwan Barghouti a copy of his book A Tale of Love and Darkness in Arabic translation with his personal dedication in Hebrew: "This story is our story, I hope you read it and understand us as we understand you, hoping to see you outside and in peace, yours, Amos Oz". The gesture was criticized by members of rightist political parties, among them Likud MK Tzipi Hotovely. Assaf Harofeh Hospital canceled Oz's invitation to give the keynote speech at an awards ceremony for outstanding physicians in the wake of this incident.

Oz supported Israeli actions in Gaza during the 2014 Israel–Gaza conflict, criticizing the tactic of using human shields, widely imputed to be employed by Hamas at the time, asking: "What would you do if your neighbor across the street sits down on the balcony, puts his little boy on his lap, and starts shooting machine-gun fire into your nursery? What would you do if your neighbor across the street digs a tunnel from his nursery to your nursery in order to blow up your home or in order to kidnap your family?"

Awards and recognition
 1965 –  literary award from Municipality of Holon
 1976 – Brenner Prize
 1983 – Bernstein Prize (original Hebrew novel category) for A Perfect Peace
 1984 – made an Officier of the Ordre des Arts et des Lettres in France.
 1986 – Bialik Prize for literature (jointly with Yitzhak Orpaz)
 1988 – French Prix Femina étranger
 1992 – Friedenspreis des Deutschen Buchhandels
 1997 – named to the French Legion of Honour
 1998 – Israel Prize for literature
 2004 – Welt-Literaturpreis from the German newspaper Die Welt
 2004 – Ovid Prize from the city of Neptun, Romania

 2005 – Goethe Prize from the city of Frankfurt, Germany for his life's work

 2006 – Jerusalem-Agnon Prize
 2006 – Corine Literature Prize (Germany)
 2007 – Prince of Asturias Award in Literature (Spain)
 2007 – A Tale of Love and Darkness named one of the ten most important books since the creation of the State of Israel
 2008 – German President's High Honor Award
 2008 – Primo Levi Prize (Italy)
 2008 – Heinrich Heine Prize of Düsseldorf, Germany

 2008 – Tel Aviv University's Dan David Prize ("Past Category") (jointly with Atom Egoyan and Tom Stoppard), for "Creative Rendering of the Past"
 2008 – Foreign Policy/Prospect list of 100 top public intellectuals (#72)

 2013 – Franz Kafka Prize
 2014 – Order of Civil Merit
 2014 – Siegfried Lenz Prize, granted by the City of Hamburg

 2015 – World premiere of the film A Tale of Love and Darkness, based on Amos Oz's autobiographical novel, takes place at the Cannes international film festival. The film is directed and co-written by Natalie Portman, who also  stars as Oz's mother, with Amir Tessler playing Oz.
 2015 – Internationaler Literaturpreis – Haus der Kulturen der Welt, Germany, winner for Judas
 2015 – Honorary degree by the University of Milan (in Language and cultures for communication and international cooperation)
 2015 – Park Kyong-ni Prize, a South Korean award valued at $100,000
 2018 – Stig Dagerman Prize, Sweden (for "Judas")

Published works
Oz published in Hebrew novels, novellas, collections of short stories. He wrote essays and journalism for Israeli and foreign papers. Works by Oz are held by the German National Library, including:

Non-fiction

 In the Land of Israel (essays on political issues) 
 Israel, Palestine and Peace: Essays (1995) (Previously published: Whose Holy Land? (1994).)
 Under This Blazing Light (1995) 
 Israeli Literature: a Case of Reality Reflecting Fiction (1985) 
 The Slopes of Lebanon (1989) 
 The Story Begins: Essays on Literature (1999) 
 A Tale of Love and Darkness (2002) 
 How to Cure a Fanatic (2006) 
 Jews and Words (20 November 2012) Oz, Amos; Oz-Salzberger, Fania. New Haven: Yale University Press. 
 Dear Zealots: Letters from a Divided Land (2017) Houghton Mifflin Harcourt, 
  What's in an Apple (Conversations with Shira Hadad), 2018

Fiction

 Where the Jackals Howl (1965) 
 Elsewhere, Perhaps (1966) 
 My Michael (1968) 
 Unto Death (1971) 
 Touch the Water, Touch the Wind (1973) 
 The Hill of Evil Counsel (1976)  ; 
 Soumchi (1978)  ; 
 A Perfect Peace (1982) 
 Black Box  (1987) 
 To Know a Woman (1989)  ; 
 Fima (1991) 
 Don't Call It Night (1994) 
 Panther in the Basement (1995) 
 The Same Sea (1999) 
 The Silence of Heaven: Agnon's Fear of God (2000) 
 Suddenly in the Depth of the Forest (A Fable for all ages) (2005), English translation by Sondra Silverston (2010) 
 Rhyming Life and Death (2007) 
 Scenes from Village Life (2009) 
 Between Friends (2012) 
 Judas (2014)

Short stories

See also 

 Amos Oz: The Nature of Dreams
 List of Israel Prize recipients
 List of Bialik Prize recipients

References

External links

  Amos Oz Archive
 2008 Dan David Prize laureate
 Amos Oz – The Nature of Dreams, Documentary film about Amos Oz: In-depth interviews, situations and literature quotes
 Heinrich Heine Award for Amos Oz: A Literary Bridge-Builder Par Excellence
 Tal Niv from Haaretz speaks with Amos Oz about "Rhyming Life and Death" and more
 
 Amos Oz interviewed on CBC Radio's Writers and Company (2010)
 "The Art of Fiction, No. 148" (Amos Oz interview), The Paris Review (Fall 1996)

Articles
 "Arafat's gift to us: Sharon", The Guardian, 8 February 2001
 "An end to Israeli occupation will mean a just war", The Observer, 7 April 2002
 "Free at last", Ynetnews, 21 August 2005
 "This can be a vote for peace", The Guardian, 30 March 2006
 "Defeating the extremists", Ynetnews, 21 November 2007
 "Don't march into Gaza", Ynetnews, 13 February 2008
 "Secure ceasefire now", Ynetnews, 31 December 2008
 http://www.tcd.ie/registrar/honorary-degrees/

 
1939 births
2018 deaths
Academic staff of Ben-Gurion University of the Negev
Hebrew University of Jerusalem alumni
Israel Prize in literature recipients
Bernstein Prize recipients
Brenner Prize recipients
Israeli atheists
Israeli Jews
Israeli male writers
Israeli people of Lithuanian-Jewish descent
Israeli people of Polish-Jewish descent
Israeli people of Ukrainian-Jewish descent
Israeli journalists
Israeli essayists
Israeli memoirists
Israeli male novelists
Israeli translators
Israeli non-fiction writers
Jewish novelists
Jewish atheists
Jews in Mandatory Palestine
Members of the European Academy of Sciences and Arts
Kibbutzniks
Prix Femina Étranger winners
Officiers of the Ordre des Arts et des Lettres
Writers from Jerusalem
Yedioth Ahronoth people
People from Arad, Israel
Deaths from cancer in Israel
Israeli novelists
Male non-fiction writers